Tony Griffin is a former inter-county hurler who retired from that in November 2009. He has since worked as a coach, including with the Kerry county football team which won the Sam Maguire Cup in 2022.

Playing career

College
He played for NUI Galway in the Fitzgibbon Cup.

Inter-county
In 2000, he was called up to the Clare inter-county team under Ger Loughnane.

In 2006, Griffin was inducted into the GAA All-Star team in the Left Corner Forward position. He had been nominated for an All-Star in twice previously, in 2004 and 2005.

On 16 November 2009, Griffin retired from inter-county hurling with Clare, citing a lack of 'confidence in the current management structure' as one of the main reasons for doing so.

Coaching
Griffin joined the Kerry county football team as a performance coach ahead of the 2022 season, a year when Kerry won the Sam Maguire Cup. Kerry forward David Clifford paid tribute to him after being named All Stars Footballer of the Year.

Jack O'Connor, the Kerry manager, also had Griffin involved when he was managing Kildare (before O'Connor returned for his third spell as Kerry manager), and Griffin was also involved with the Dublin county hurling team when Anthony Daly was manager.

Personal life

Cycle For Cancer
In 2007, Griffin took a year out of hurling to do a cycle across Canada in memory of his father Jerome, who died from cancer.

Autobiography
In June 2010, Griffin released his autobiography, titled Screaming At The Sky.

References

External links
Tony Griffin Foundation

1981 births
Living people
Ballyea hurlers
Clare inter-county hurlers
Dublin county hurling team
Gaelic football coaches
Hurling coaches
Kerry county football team
Kildare county football team
University of Galway hurlers